The 2019 Lisburn and Castlereagh City Council election was the second election to Lisburn and Castlereagh city Council, part of the Northern Ireland local elections on 2 May 2019, returned 40 members to the Lisburn and Castlereagh city Council via Single Transferable Vote.

Election results

Note: "Votes" are the first preference votes.

The overall turnout was 49.21% with a total of 50,268 valid votes cast. A total of 479 ballots were rejected.

Districts summary

|- class="unsortable" align="centre"
!rowspan=2 align="left"|Ward
! % 
!Cllrs
! %
!Cllrs
! %
!Cllrs
! %
!Cllrs
! %
!Cllrs
! %
!Cllrs
!rowspan=2|TotalCllrs
|- class="unsortable" align="center"
!colspan=2 bgcolor="" | DUP
!colspan=2 bgcolor="" | UUP
!colspan=2 bgcolor="" | Alliance
!colspan=2 bgcolor=""| SDLP
!colspan=2 bgcolor="" | Sinn Féin
!colspan=2 bgcolor="white"| Others
|-
|align="left"|Castlereagh East
|bgcolor="#D46A4C"|49.8
|bgcolor="#D46A4C"|3
|10.4
|1
|30.8
|2
|0.0
|0
|0.0
|0
|9.1
|0
|6
|-
|align="left"|Castlereagh South
|22.5
|1
|6.9
|1
|bgcolor="#F6CB2F"|31.6
|bgcolor="#F6CB2F"|2
|15.8
|1
|11.8
|1
|11.3
|1
|7
|-
|align="left"|Downshire East
|bgcolor="#D46A4C"|44.7
|bgcolor="#D46A4C"|2
|27.1
|2
|21.3
|1
|6.8
|0
|0.0
|0
|0.0
|0
|5
|-
|align="left"|Downshire West
|bgcolor="#D46A4C"|37.4
|bgcolor="#D46A4C"|2
|25.4
|2
|25.9
|1
|4.9
|0
|0.0
|0
|6.4
|0
|5
|-
|align="left"|Killultagh
|bgcolor="#D46A4C"|38.0
|bgcolor="#D46A4C"|2
|17.8
|1
|20.3
|1
|9.2
|0
|13.2
|1
|1.4
|0
|5
|-
|align="left"|Lisburn North
|bgcolor="#D46A4C"|33.6
|bgcolor="#D46A4C"|2
|17.7
|2
|20.3
|1
|11.6
|1
|8.9
|0
|7.9
|0
|6
|-
|align="left"|Lisburn South
|bgcolor="#D46A4C"|36.4
|bgcolor="#D46A4C"|3
|22.9
|2
|13.3
|1
|9.3
|0
|0.0
|0
|18.1
|0
|6
|-
|- class="unsortable" class="sortbottom" style="background:#C9C9C9"
|align="left"| Total
|36.7
|15
|17.6
|11
|23.6
|9
|8.7
|2
|5.4
|2
|7.9
|1
|40
|-
|}

District results

Castlereagh East

2014: 3 x DUP, 1 x Alliance, 1 x UUP, 1 x TUV
2019: 3 x DUP, 2 x Alliance, 1 x UUP
2014-2019 Change: Alliance gain from TUV

Castlereagh South

2014: 2 x Alliance, 2 x DUP, 2 x SDLP, 1 x UUP
2019: 2 x Alliance, 1 x DUP, 1 x SDLP, 1 x UUP, 1 x Sinn Féin, 1 x Green
2014-2019 Change: Sinn Féin and Green gain from DUP and SDLP

Downshire East 

2014: 3 x DUP, 1 x UUP, 1 x Alliance
2019: 2 x DUP, 2 x UUP, 1 x Alliance
2014-2019 Change: UUP gain from DUP

Downshire West 

2014: 2 x DUP, 2 x UUP, 1 x Alliance
2019: 2 x DUP, 2 x UUP, 1 x Alliance
2014-2019 Change: No change

Killultagh

2014: 3 x DUP, 1 x UUP, 1 x SDLP
2019: 2 x DUP, 1 x UUP, 1 x Alliance, 1 x Sinn Féin
2014-2019 Change: Alliance and Sinn Féin gain from DUP and SDLP

Lisburn North

2014: 3 x DUP, 1 x UUP, 1 x Alliance, 1 x NI21
2019: 2 x DUP, 2 x UUP, 1 x Alliance, 1 x SDLP
2014-2019 Change: UUP gain from DUP, NI21 joins SDLP

Lisburn South

2014: 4 x DUP, 1 x UUP, 1 x Alliance
2019: 3 x DUP, 2 x UUP, 1 x Alliance
2014-2019 Change: UUP gain from DUP

Changes during the term

† Co-options

‡ Changes in affiliation

– Suspensions
None

Last update 5 August 2022.

Current composition: see Lisburn and Castlereagh.

Notes

References

2019 Northern Ireland local elections
21st century in County Antrim
21st century in County Down
Elections in County Antrim
Elections in County Down